The Russian Chemical Reviews is a translation of Journal Uspekhi Khimii which is a monthly Russian scientific journal on chemistry, established in 1932. The journal cover aspects of modern chemistry. According to the Journal Citation Reports, its 2021 impact factor is 7.460

References 

Monthly journals
Russian Academy of Sciences academic journals